Iera Echebarría Fernández (born 20 October 1992) is a Spanish rugby sevens player. She competed for Spain at the 2016 Summer Olympics in Brazil. She was a member of the Spanish women's sevens squad. She was part of the squad that secured the final Olympic spot for the Rio Olympics.

Echebarría competed at the 2022 Rugby World Cup Sevens in Cape Town.

References

External links 
 
 
 
 

1992 births
Living people
Spain international women's rugby union players
Spain international women's rugby sevens players
Olympic rugby sevens players of Spain
Rugby sevens players at the 2016 Summer Olympics
Place of birth missing (living people)
Sportspeople from Madrid
Rugby union players from the Community of Madrid